The Journal of Political Economy is a monthly peer-reviewed academic journal published by the University of Chicago Press. Established by James Laurence Laughlin in 1892, it covers both theoretical and empirical economics. In the past, the journal published quarterly from its introduction through 1905, ten issues per volume from 1906 through 1921, and bimonthly from 1922 through 2019. The editor-in-chief is Magne Mogstad (University of Chicago).

It is considered one of the top five journals in economics.

Abstracting and indexing 
The journal is abstracted and indexed in EBSCO, ProQuest, EconLit

, Research Papers in Economics, Current Contents/Social & Behavioral Sciences, and the Social Sciences Citation Index. According to the Journal Citation Reports, the journal has a 2020 impact factor of 9.103, ranking it 4/376 journals in the category "Economics".

The journal is department-owned University of Chicago journal.

Notable papers 

Among the most influential papers that appeared in the Journal of Political Economy are:
 "The Economics of Exhaustible Resources", by Harold Hotelling; Vol. 39, No. 2 (1931), pp. 137–175. 
 ... stated Hotelling's rule, laid foundations to non-renewable resource economics.
 "The Economics of Slavery in the Ante Bellum South", by Alfred H. Conrad and John R. Meyer; Vol. 66, No. 2 (1958), pp. 95–130. 
 ... first to apply econometric methods to a historic question, which triggered the development of Cliometrics.
 "The Pricing of Options and Corporate Liabilities", by Fischer Black and Myron Scholes; Vol. 81, No. 3 (1973), pp. 637–654. 
 ... highly influential for introducing the Black–Scholes model for option pricing.
 "Are Government Bonds Net Wealth?", by Robert Barro;  Vol. 82, No. 6 (1974), pp. 1095–1117. 
 ... re-introduced the Ricardian equivalence to macroeconomics, pointing out flaws in Keynesian theory.
 "Rules Rather than Discretion: The Inconsistency of Optimal Plans", by Finn E. Kydland and Edward C. Prescott; Vol. 85, No. 3 (1977), pp. 473–492. 
 ... influential new classical critique of Keynesian macroeconomic modelling.
 "Endogenous Technological Change", by Paul M. Romer; Vol. 98, No. 5, (1990) pp. S71–S102. 
 ... the second of two papers in which Romer laid foundations to the endogenous growth theory.
 "Increasing Returns and Economic Geography", by Paul Krugman; Vol. 99, No. 3 (1991), pp. 483–499. 
 ... revived the field of economic geography, introducing the core–periphery model.

References

External links 
 

Economics journals
University of Chicago Press academic journals
Political science journals
Bimonthly journals
English-language journals
Publications established in 1892
1892 in economics
Political economy